is a Japanese singer. She is best known for her 2001 single "Nada Sōsō."

Childhood 
Natsukawa was born in Ishigaki, the largest city in the Yaeyama Islands chain. From age 7, she practiced two hours a day with her father to become an enka singer. At 9, she won a local singing contest (the ). Natsukawa continued to win competitions, and in 1984 won the MBS TV show 's grand prize. In 1986, she won the 's grand prize, and was the youngest person to win this prize at the time.

Pony Canyon debut 
Natsukawa, by chance, was scouted shortly after winning the competition at 13 years old. She moved to Tokyo, and started preparing for her debut. She debuted later in 1989 as an enka singer with the name "Misato Hoshi," under Pony Canyon. She released three singles in three years, and did not find much success.

Natsukawa felt defeated after this, and after living for four years in Tokyo, she moved back to Okinawa. She lived with her older sister in Naha, and helped out in her restaurant, singing for patrons daily. As patrons would travel quite a distance to hear her sing, she gradually regained her desire to be a singer.

In 1998, she appeared on an Okinawan radio show called  as an assistant.

Re-debut 
Natsukawa's musical director from her Pony Canyon days decided to set up a music production company for her, and in 1999 asked if she could return to the capital. She was soon signed under Victor Entertainment, and re-debuted with the single . She was finding similar success to her debut, as neither of her first singles charted. While watching the news broadcast of the 26th G8 summit held in Okinawa, Natsukawa watched a performance of Okinawan folk band Begin perform a song called "Nada Sōsō." She found she could not get it out of her head, and requested that she could cover the song backstage at a Begin concert. The song was released as her third single in March 2001.

Very slowly and steadily, the song started gaining popularity. It was a hit on Okinawan radio, and in May 2002 (over a year since its release) it first charted in the Oricon top 100 singles charts. Natsukawa released an EP of Okinawan cover songs, Minamikaze, in May, adding to the momentum. By June, the single had broken the top 50, and by July the top 20. Her debut album Tida: Tida Kaji nu Umui was released in September. Natsukawa was asked to perform the song at the 2002 Kōhaku Uta Gassen (New Year's song competition), which made the song break the top 10.

None of these three releases charted very highly, but they all charted extremely gradually. By the time Tida: Tida Kaji nu Umui and Minamikaze stopped charting (roughly two years later), they had sold 280,000/371,000 copies respectively. "Nada Sōsō" stopped charting a total of six years after its release, and sold over 680,000 copies.

Natsukawa released a string of Okinawan song-based released from this time until 2004. One of these,  (a Misako Koja cover), was nominated for the Japan Record Award. It was Natsukawa's biggest hit since Nada Sōsō, reaching the top 20.

Original song move 
In 2004, Natsukawa's music changed to centre more around original songs, with her third album Kaze no Michi (her second, Sora no Keshiki, featured many original songs, but still centred on Okinawan folk songs). She started a trend in her music for collaborating with high-profile musicians (Kazufumi Miyazawa, The Gospellers). Her 2005 follow-up, Ayakaji no Ne, was similar, with Kentarō Kobuchi of Kobukuro writing her single . Natsukawa's releases began dropping in sales, with "Sayōnara Arigatō" being her most recent top 50 single, with its 2006 re-release.

In 2006, she released a compilation album, Rimi Natsukawa Selection, that was only for release in non-Japanese Asian countries. The album was a massive success in Taiwan, reaching #1 on the Taiwanese album charts.

In 2007, Natsukawa ended her contract with her production office. She continued to release music under Victor, however, such as her 5th album Umui Kaji.

Song Search 
At Natsukawa's concerts and at her website, she began asking for submissions from fans for songs they would like to hear her cover. The result of this was the  project, where Natsukawa worked on covering mainly Japanese popular songs. This resulted in the album Uta Sagashi: Request Cover Album, her most successful release of her material since 2003.

Since this, Natsukawa has continued to release original material and compilations. Her second Uta Sagashi album was released in February 2010, and is her first bilingual Japanese/Chinese album.

Personal life 
Natsukawa married percussionist  on January 1, 2009. Their first child, a boy, was born on August 20, 2010.

Discography

Studio albums 
 2002: Tida: Tida Kaji nu Umui
 2003: Sora no Keshiki
 2004: Kaze no Michi
 2005: Ayakaji no Ne
 2007: Umui Kaji
 2009: Kokoro no Uta

Cover albums 
 2002: Minamikaze (EP)
 2003: Famureuta (EP)
 2007: Uta Sagashi: Request Cover Album
 2010: Uta Sagashi: Asia no Kaze

Compilation albums 
 2004: Okinawa no Kaze
 2005: Rimi Natsukawa Single Collection Vol. 1
 2006: Rimits: Best Duet Songs
 2006: Rimi Natsukawa Selection
 2008: Ai no Uta: Self-Selection Best
 2009: Okinawa Uta: Chikyū no Kaze o Kanjite
 2010: Misato Hoshi Best Collection

Top 50 singles 
 2001: "Nada Sōsō"
 2003: "Michishirube"
 2003: "Tori yo"
 2003: "Warabigami (Yamatoguchi)"
 2004: "Kana yo Kana yo"
 2004: "Kokoro Tsutae"
 2005: "Sayōnara Arigatō"
 2006: "Sayōnara Arigatō (Ama no Kaze)/Mirai"

References

External links 

  
 Official Victor Site (Japanese)
 
 

1973 births
Enka singers
Living people
Japanese women pop singers
Japanese folk singers
Musicians from Okinawa Prefecture
21st-century Japanese singers
21st-century Japanese women singers